Qods Garrison ( – Pādegān-e Qods) is a village and garrison in Sarrud-e Jonubi Rural District, in the Central District of Boyer-Ahmad County, Kohgiluyeh and Boyer-Ahmad Province, Iran. At the 2006 census, its population was 2,155, in 400 families.

References 

Populated places in Boyer-Ahmad County
Military installations of Iran